The first series of British reality television show Pop Idol was broadcast on ITV in the United Kingdom during the winter months of 2001 and 2002. The show was a singing competition open to people aged between 16 and 26 years old, with the winner receiving a £1 million recording contract to release their debut album. Pop Idol received ratings of as high as 10 million viewers for shows before the live final.

Auditions were held during the early months and summer of 2001 in various locations across the United Kingdom. Selected acts were broadcast on a series of audition programmes in October 2001. The first live show was broadcast on 15 December 2001 and the live final was held on 9 February 2002. The competition was won by Will Young, with Gareth Gates finishing as the runner-up after a public vote. Both of the finalists went on to have chart successes with both their debut releases and subsequent material. Third-placed Darius Danesh also gained a record deal and achieved a string of top-40 hits in the United Kingdom, including a number-one single.

The live shows were broadcast in two parts on Saturday evenings. Each of the contestants sang in an early show at around 19:00 GMT and the results were given in a show broadcast later in the evening.

Judges and presenters
The show had four judges, Simon Cowell, Pete Waterman, Nicki Chapman and Neil Fox, who gave comments on both the auditions and live performances of the singers. Chapman had also been a judge on the first series of Popstars, a previous ITV talent show with a similar format. Waterman was later a judge on Popstars: The Rivals, the second and final series of Popstars.

Presenting duo Ant & Dec hosted the main shows on ITV1, with Kate Thornton presenting the spin-off programme Pop Idol Extra on ITV2.

Finalists

* as of the start of the series

Heats and live shows
The heats began airing on 3 November 2001, and consisted of five heats of ten singers. The performance shows were prerecorded on the previous Wednesday, and were shown on the Saturday, with the live results shows following after. Contestants dressed the same to create the illusion that the earlier performances were live. The two contestants from each heat with the most votes progressed to the top 10, where all shows were live. The live shows began on 15 December 2001, and continued through to the live final on 9 February 2002.

Results summary
Colour key

 Darius Danesh was originally eliminated on 8 December results show, placing third in his heat. However, he returned to the show when Rik Waller, who had won the heat, was forced to pull out of the competition due to illness. Danesh started competing from the show of 22 December.

Live show details

Heat 1 (3 November 2001 - recorded on 31 October 2001)

Notes
The five contestants who received the highest number of votes were revealed in reverse order. Gareth Gates and Zoe Birkett advanced to the top 10 of the competition and the other eight contestants were eliminated.
Haifa Kayali later auditioned for the second series of The X Factor where she again narrowly missed out on the live shows, after being eliminated in the judges' houses round.
Laverne Scott-Roberts appeared on The Voice UK in 2014 and her performance made all four mentors want to work with her. She chose to join Tom Jones' team.

Heat 2 (10 November 2001 - Recorded on 7 November 2001)

Notes;
 The hosts revealed the five contestants who received the highest number of votes in reverse order. Hayley Evetts and Laura Doherty advanced to the top 10 of the competition. The other 8 contestants were eliminated.
 Nikk was later a finalist on Popstars: The Rivals, but failed to win a place in One True Voice and instead joined the boy band Phixx, who disbanded after one album. He later auditioned for the fifth series of The X Factor in 2008, but the judges didn't put him through.

Heat 3 (17 November 2001 - Recorded on 14 November 2001)

Notes;
 The five contestants who received the highest number of votes were revealed in reverse order. Rosie Ribbons and Jessica Garlick advanced to the top 10 of the competition. The other eight contestants were eliminated
 All four judges predicted that Andrew Derbyshire would progress, but he failed to make the top five in the public vote. He later auditioned for Simon again during Britain's Got Talent.

Heat 4 (24 November 2001 - Recorded on 21 November 2001)

Notes
The five contestants who received the highest number of votes were revealed in reverse order. Will Young and Korben advanced to the top 10 of the competition. The other eight contestants were eliminated.
Natalie Anderson was eliminated, but later found fame when she appeared in the West End production of Wicked and several television shows, including a lengthy stint in The Royal and Holby City. She currently appears in ITV soap opera Emmerdale, playing the part of Alicia Metcalfe.

Heat 5 (1 December 2001 - Recorded on 28 November 2001)

Notes
The five contestants who received the highest number of votes were revealed in reverse order. Rik Waller and Aaron Bayley advanced to the top 10 of the competition. The other eight contestants were eliminated.
Although originally eliminated, Darius Danesh made a return to the live shows when Rik Waller was forced to pull out due to a throat infection. He earned his reprieve for finishing third in the group.
Although she failed to make the top 10, Sarah Whatmore was still signed by Simon Cowell. She released two singles which charted in the UK. Cowell later stated in an interview that he introduced the wildcard round in the second series of Pop Idol to avoid prematurely losing talented contestants like Whatmore.
Hayley Bamford successfully reauditioned for the second series of Pop Idol in 2003, becoming the only member of this year's heats to again make it to the top 50. However, she was again eliminated at this stage.

Live show 1 (15 December 2001)
Theme: Idols

Notes
 Only nine of the singers performed on the night as Rik Waller had a throat infection that prevented him from singing. The producers allowed Waller to sit out the first week and, if he had recovered, let him compete from the second week. A decision was made that if he failed to recover, Darius Danesh (who had missed out on a place in the final 10 in the same heat as Waller) would take his place. Waller visited a doctor in the week following the first show to assess his condition.
 After the series ended, it was revealed that Will Young had the most votes this week, with Gareth Gates polling second and Zoe Birkett third.
Korben Niblett left the show after receiving the lowest number of votes.

Live show 2 (22 December 2001)
Theme: Christmas songs

Notes;

 Rik Waller pulled out of Pop Idol on the day of the second live show, having waited to make a last-minute decision. Darius Danesh immediately replaced him as one of the nine remaining contestants.
Jessica Garlick was voted off the show after receiving the lowest number of votes.

Live show 3 (29 December 2001)
Theme: Burt Bacharach songs

Notes

Aaron Bayley left the show after receiving the lowest number of votes. His exit created controversy as some viewers claimed that they had been unable to register their votes to keep him in the competition.

Live show 4 (5 January 2002)
Theme: Songs from films

Notes
 Laura Doherty received the fewest votes, and was eliminated from the competition.
 For the first time, only the bottom two were announced, instead of the bottom three.
 Zoe Birkett had been scheduled to sing "The Power of Love" by Jennifer Rush all week, but had to change it at the last minute having found out it had never actually appeared in a film.

Live show 5 (12 January 2002)
Theme: Songs by ABBA

Notes
 Rosie Ribbons was eliminated from the show after receiving the fewest public votes.
 For the first time, there was no bottom two or bottom three announced, though it was later revealed that Hayley Evetts was second bottom this week.
 There was a change in the leader of the public vote for the first time this week, with Gareth Gates overtaking Will Young.

Live show 6 (19 January 2002)
Theme: Big band

Notes
 Hayley Evetts received the fewest votes and was eliminated.
 Simon Cowell and Pete Waterman had a major argument on air, after Waterman objected to Cowell's criticism of Danesh.

Live show 7 (26 January 2002)
Theme: Number-one hits

Notes
 Zoe Birkett received the fewest viewer votes, and was eliminated from the competition.
 Contestants performed two songs this week, back-to-back.

Live show 8: Semi-final (2 February 2002)
Theme: Judges' Choice

Notes
 Darius Danesh was eliminated from the competition having received the fewest viewer votes, leaving Gareth Gates and Will Young to compete the final.

Live final (9 February 2002)
In the week leading to the final performances, finalists Gareth Gates and Will Young both went on individual nationwide publicity campaign tours, visiting radio stations and newspapers and giving performances in a bid to help generate support. Both finalists travelled in their own personal bus.

 Will Young won the competition having received 53.1% of the record 8.7 million votes.

Reception

Ratings

Releases
Pop Idol: The Big Band Album

References

Series 01
2001 British television seasons
2002 British television seasons
2001 in British music
2002 in British music